Mohamed Al-Muntasir ( born 1960) is a Libyan businessman who represents the city of Misrata on the National Transitional Council.

References

1960 births
Living people
Members of the National Transitional Council
Libyan businesspeople